Johnson & Johnson (J&J) is an American multinational corporation founded in 1886 that develops medical devices, pharmaceuticals, and consumer packaged goods. Its common stock is a component of the Dow Jones Industrial Average and the company is ranked No. 36 on the 2021 Fortune 500 list of the largest United States corporations by total revenue. Johnson & Johnson is one of the world's most valuable companies, and is one of only two U.S.-based companies that has a prime credit rating of AAA, higher than that of the United States government.

Johnson & Johnson is headquartered in New Brunswick, New Jersey, the consumer division being located in Skillman, New Jersey. The corporation includes some 250 subsidiary companies with operations in 60 countries and products sold in over 175 countries. Johnson & Johnson had worldwide sales of $93.8billion during calendar year 2021.

Johnson & Johnson's brands include numerous household names of medications and first aid supplies. Among its well-known consumer products are the Band-Aid Brand line of bandages, Tylenol medications, Johnson's Baby products, Neutrogena skin and beauty products, Clean & Clear facial wash and Acuvue contact lenses. Johnson & Johnson's pharmaceutical arm is Janssen Pharmaceuticals.

The company announced in November 2021 that it would split into two publicly traded companies: one focused on consumer products and the other on pharmaceuticals and medical technologies.

History

1873–1885: Before Johnson & Johnson 
Robert Wood Johnson began his professional training at age 16 as a pharmaceutical apprentice at an apothecary run by his mother's cousin, James G. Wood, in Poughkeepsie, New York. Johnson co-founded his own company with George Seabury in 1873. The New York-based Seabury & Johnson became known for its medicated plasters. Robert Wood Johnson represented the company at the 1876 World's Fair. There he heard Joseph Lister's explanation of a new procedure: antiseptic surgery. Johnson parted ways with his business partner Seabury in 1885.

1886: Founding of Johnson & Johnson 

Robert Wood Johnson joined his brothers, James Wood Johnson and Edward Mead Johnson, and created a line of ready-to-use sterile surgical dressings in 1886. They founded Johnson & Johnson in 1886 with 14 employees, eight women and six men. They manufactured sterile surgical supplies, household products, and medical guides. Those products initially featured a logo that resembled the signature of James Wood Johnson, very similar to the current logo. Robert Wood Johnson served as the first president of the company.

1887–1942: Early history 
The company sold medicated plasters such as Johnson & Johnson's Black Perfect Taffeta Court Plaster and also manufactured the world's first sterile surgical products, including sutures, absorbent cotton, and gauze. The company published "Modern Methods of Antiseptic Wound Treatment", a guide on how to do sterile surgery using its products, and in 1888, distributed 85,000 copies to doctors and pharmacists across the United States. The manual was translated into three languages and distributed worldwide. The first commercial first aid kit was designed in 1888 to support railroad construction workers, who were often hundreds of miles from medical care. The kits included antiseptic emergency supplies and directions for field use. In 1901, the company published the Handbook of First Aid, a guide on applying first aid.

In 1889, the company hired pharmacist Fred Kilmer as its first scientific director, who led its scientific research and wrote educational manuals. Kilmer's first achievement as scientific director was developing the industrial sterilization process. He was employed at the company until 1934.

Johnson & Johnson had more than 400 employees and 14 buildings by 1894. In 1894, the company began producing Johnson's Baby Powder, the company's first baby product.

The company introduced the world's first maternity kit in 1894 to aid at-home births. The kit contained antiseptic soap, sanitary napkins, umbilical tape, and Johnson's Baby Powder. The products were later marketed separately, including "Lister's Towels", the world's first mass-produced sanitary napkins. Kilmer wrote "Hygiene in Maternity", an instructional guide for mothers before and after delivery. In 1904, the company expanded its baby care products with "Lister's Sanitary Diapers", a diaper product for infants.

During the Spanish–American War, Johnson & Johnson developed and donated 300,000 packaged compressed surgical dressings for soldiers in the field and created a trauma stretcher for field medics. The company donated its products in disaster relief efforts of the 1900 Galveston hurricane and the 1906 San Francisco earthquake.

Johnson & Johnson vaccinated all of its employees against smallpox during the 1901 smallpox epidemic. The firm employed more than 1,200 people by 1910. Women accounted for half of the company's workforce and led a quarter of its departments.

Robert Wood Johnson died in 1910, and he was succeeded as president of the company by his brother James Wood Johnson.

During World War I, Johnson & Johnson factories increased production to meet wartime demands for sterile surgical products. In 1916, the company acquired Chicopee Manufacturing Company in Chicopee Falls, Massachusetts, to meet demand. Near the end of World War I, the 1918 flu pandemic broke out. The company invented and distributed an epidemic mask which helped prevent the spread of the flu.

In 1919, Johnson & Johnson opened the Gilmour Plant near Montreal, its first factory outside of the United States, which produced surgical products for international customers. In 1924 the company's first overseas manufacturing facility was opened in Slough, England.

In 1920, Earle Dickson combined two Johnson & Johnson products, adhesive tape and gauze, to create the first commercial adhesive bandage. Band-Aid Brand Adhesive Bandages began sales the following year. In 1921, the company released Johnson's Baby Soap. Named after its Massachusetts facility, Johnson & Johnson built a textile mill and company town, Chicopee, outside of Gainesville, Georgia. In the 1930s, the company expanded operations to Argentina, Brazil, Mexico, and South Africa. In 1931, Johnson & Johnson introduced the first prescription contraceptive gel marketed as Ortho-Gynol.

Robert Wood Johnson II became president of the company in 1932.

During The Great Depression Johnson & Johnson kept all its workers employed and raised wages by five percent. In 1933, Robert Wood Johnson II wrote a letter to Franklin D. Roosevelt, calling for a federal law to increase wages and reduce hours for all American workers. The company also opened a new facility in Chicago during that period. Johnson wrote and distributed "Try Reality: A Discussion of Hours, Wages, and The Industrial Future" to persuade business leaders to follow his lead, advocating that business is more than profit and that companies have responsibilities to consumers, employees, and society. In "Try Reality", the section titled "An Industrial Philosophy" would later become the company's credo.

In 1935, Johnson's Baby Oil was added to its line of baby products. Both male and female Johnson & Johnson employees were drafted and enlisted during World War II. The company ensured no one would lose their job when they returned home. Robert Wood Johnson II was appointed head of the Smaller War Plants Corporation in Washington, D.C. His work ensured U.S. factories with under 500 employees were awarded government contracts.

1943: Credo and going public 
In 1943, as the company was preparing for its initial public offering (IPO), Robert Wood Johnson wrote what the company would call, "Our Credo", a defining document that has been used to guide the company's decisions over the years. The company completed its IPO and became a public company in 1944.

In 1943, Vesta Stoudt identified a need for waterproof tape for ammunition boxes in World War Two. She wrote to Franklin D. Roosevelt with the idea; the president commissioned Revolite, a subsidiary of Johnson & Johnson at the time, to develop and manufacture a cloth-based adhesive tape.

1944-1999: Acquisitions and international expansion 

In 1944, the company began selling Johnson's Baby Lotion. The same year, the company established Ethicon Suture Laboratories. In 1947, G. F. Merson Ltd. was acquired to expand the company’s suture business in the United Kingdom. The company was rebranded and absorbed into Ethicon.

Johnson & Johnson Chairman of the Board Robert Wood Johnson published Or Forfeit Freedom in 1947. The book outlined that businesses need to develop sustainable methods of using natural resources for the future of business and the planet.

In 1955, Ethicon developed a micro point reverse--‐cutting ophthalmic needle attached to the suture. Micro-point surgical needles and sutures allowed for advances in modern vision surgery. In 1956, the company open its first Asia-based operating company in the Philippines. The following year, an operating company opened in India.

In 1959, Johnson & Johnson acquired McNeil Laboratories. A year later, the company sold Tylenol for the first time without a prescription. In the same year, Cilag Chemie joined Johnson & Johnson as Cilag. In 1961, Janssen Pharmaceutica was acquired by Johnson & Johnson. Janssen Pharmaceutica was founded in 1953 by Belgian scientist Dr. Paul Janssen.

In 1963, Philip B. Hofmann succeeded Robert Wood Johnson as Chairman and CEO. He was the first non-Johnson family member to become chief executive. Hofmann also helped found the Robert Wood Johnson Foundation. In the same year, the Food and Drug Administration approved a synthetic hormone contraceptive pill, Ortho-Novum.

In 1965, Johnson & Johnson acquired Codman & Shurtleff. The acquired company produced neurovascular devices and neurosurgery technologies. In 1968, the company developed the RhoGAM Vaccine. The vaccine prevented Rh hemolytic disease in newborns.

In 1969, Ortho Diagnostics, a company subsidiary, launched the Sickledex Tube Test for detecting anemia. The same year, the FDA approved the Johnson & Johnson arterial graft. In 1971, the company launched Hapindex Diagnostic Test, a rapid Hepatitis B test for blood donors. The test was developed to prevent the spread of Hepatitis B through blood transfusions.

In 1973, Richard Sellars became Chairman and CEO of Johnson & Johnson. In 1976, James E. Burke became the company’s Chairman and CEO. During Burke’s tenure, he managed the 1982 Tylenol tampering incident. It became a case study on crisis management. Under his leadership, the company recalled 31 million bottles of Tylenol, relaunched the product with a triple tamper-evident seal, and urged consumers not to use if tampered with. These practices became the pharmaceutical and packaged food industry norm.

Johnson & Johnson opened operating companies in China and Egypt in 1985. In 1987, Acuvue contact lenses became the first disposable contact lenses available to consumers. The lenses lasted up to one week, reducing the cost of contact lenses. In the same year, the company launched One Touch, a blood glucose monitoring system. In 1989, Ralph S. Larsen was appointed Chairman and CEO of the company.

After the Dissolution of the Soviet Union, Johnson & Johnson expanded into eastern Europe. By 1991, the company had a presence in Hungary, Russia, the Czech Republic, and Poland. In the 1990s, the company acquired many familiar consumer health brands that made up the Johnson & Johnson family of companies. These acquisitions included Clean & Clear, Neutrogena, Motrin, and Aveeno.

Johnson & Johnson opened an operating company in Israel in 1996. In 1997, Johnson & Johnson acquired Biosense Webster. DePuy was acquired by Johnson & Johnson in 1998, rolling it into the Medtech business group.

2000-present 
William C. Weldon was appointed Chairman and CEO of the company in 2002. In 2003, Ethicon launched Vicryl Plus Antibacterial Sutures. The products prevent post-surgery infection within stitches. In 2006, Johnson & Johnson acquired Pfizer's consumer healthcare business and merged it with its consumer healthcare business group. The acquisition added brands like Listerine, Bengay, and Neosporin to the company’s portfolio. In the same year, Johnson & Johnson’s Janssen Pharmaceuticals, launched Prezista, a protease inhibitor for patients with failed previous HIV therapies.

In 2008, Johnson & Johnson acquired Mentor Corporation for $1 billion and merge its operations into Ethicon. In 2009, the company acquired HealthMedia, later renamed to Health & Wellness Solutions and the Human Performance Institute. In October 2010, J&J acquired Crucell for $2.4 billion. The subsidiary operates as the centre for vaccines, within Johnson & Johnson pharmaceuticals business group.

In 2012, Alex Gorsky became Chairman and CEO of Johnson & Johnson. In November 2015, Biosense Webster, Inc. acquired Coherex Medical Inc. expanding the company’s range of treatment options for patients with atrial fibrillation.

In 2017, Johnson & Johnson acquired Abbott Medical Optics from Abbott Laboratories for $4.325 billion, adding the new division into Johnson & Johnson Vision Care, Inc. in 2017. The same year, Johnson & Johnson acquired Actelion in a $30 billion deal, the largest ever purchase by the company. After the purchase, Johnson & Johnson spun off Actelion’s research and development unit, into a separate legal entity. In July 2017, Johnson & Johnson Vision Care, Inc acquired TearScience. In September 2017, the company acquired subscription-based contact lens startup Sightbox. In September of the same year Johnson & Johnson Medical GmbH acquired Emerging Implant Technologies GmbH, manufacturer of 3D-printed titanium interbody implants for spinal fusion surgery.

In March 2019, the FDA approved esketamine for the treatment of severe depression, which is marketed as Spravato by Janssen Pharmaceuticals. In 2019, Johnson & Johnson announced the release of photochromic contact lenses. The lenses adjust to sunlight and help eyes recover from bright light exposure faster. The lenses contain a photochromic additive that adapts visible light amounts filtered to the eyes and are the first to use such additives.

In November 2020, Johnson & Johnson acquired Momenta Pharmaceuticals for $6.5 billion.

In January 2022, Joaquin Duato became CEO of Johnson & Johnson.

In November 2022, Johnson & Johnson announced that it would acquire Abiomed Inc for $16.6 billion. The deal closed on December 22.

Coronavirus (COVID-19) response 
Johnson & Johnson committed over $1 billion toward the development of a not-for-profit COVID-19 vaccine in partnership with the Biomedical Advanced Research and Development Authority (BARDA) Office of the Assistant Secretary for Preparedness and Response (ASPR) at the U.S. Department of Health and Human Services (HHS). Paul Stoffels of Johnson & Johnson said, "In order to go fast, the people of Johnson & Johnson are committed to do this and all together we say we're going to do this not for profit. That's the fastest and the best way to find all the collaborations in the world to make this happen so we commit to bring this at a not-for-profit level."

Janssen Vaccines, in partnership with Beth Israel Deaconess Medical Center (BIDMC), is responsible for developing the vaccine candidate, based on the same technology used to make its Ebola vaccine. The vaccine candidate is expected to enter phase 1 human clinical study in September 2020.

Demand for the product Tylenol surged two to four times normal levels in March 2020. In response, the company increased production globally. For example, the Tylenol plant in Puerto Rico ran 24 hours a day, seven days a week.

In response to the shortage of ventilators, Ethicon, with Prisma Health, made and distributed the VESper Ventilator Expansion Splitter, which uses 3D printing technology, to allow one ventilator to support two patients.

Johnson & Johnson
Johnson & Johnson Consumer Inc. (Consumer Healthcare Division)
Dabao Cosmetics Co.
Johnson & Johnson Consumer France SAS
Groupe Vendome SA
LGE Performance Systems, Inc.
HealthMedia, Inc.
Vogue International LLC
TriStrata Inc.
NeoStrata Company, Inc.
Zarbee's, Inc.
Medical Devices Division
Biosense Webster (Acq 1997)
Coherex Medical, Inc. (Acq 2015)
DePuy Synthes (Acq 1998)
Codman & Shurteff, Inc. (Acq 1965)
Micrus Endovascular
Pulsar Vascular Inc.
Neuravi
DePuy Mitek, Inc.
DePuy Orthopaedics, Inc.
Biomedical Enterprises, Inc.	
DePuy Spine, Inc
Interventional Spine, Inc.
DePuy Synthes Products, Inc
Sentio, LLC
Olive Medical Corporation
Advanced Sterilization Products (Divested 2018)
Apsis SAS
Gloster Europe	
Orthotaxy
Johnson & Johnson Medical GmbH
Surgical Process Institute
Emerging Implant Technologies GmbH (Acq. 2017)
Ethicon, Inc. (Est. 1944 as Ethicon Suture Laboratories)
G. F. Merson Ltd (Acq. 1947)
Mentor (Acq. 2008)
Omrix Biopharmaceuticals, Inc.
Acclarent
NeuWave Medical, Inc
Torax Medical
Johnson & Johnson (China) Investment Ltd
Guangzhou Bioseal Biotechnology Co., Ltd.
Ethicon Endo-Surgery
SurgRx, Inc.
SterilMed, Inc.
Megadyne Medical Products, Inc.
Auris Health Inc
Verb Surgical Inc
Abiomed Inc (Acq. pending)
Impella CardioSystems AG (Acq. 2005)
ECP Entwicklungsgesellschaft mbH (Acq. 2014)
Aachen Innovative Solution GmbH
preCARDIA (Acq. 2021)
Breethe (Acq. 2020)
Janssen Diagnostics BVBA
Johnson & Johnson Vision Care, Inc.
Vistakon
Abbott Medical Optics (Acq. 2017)
TearScience
Sightbox	
Pharmaceuticals Division
Janssen Pharmaceutica (Acq. 1961)
Cilag (Acq. 1959)
J B Chemicals & Pharmaceuticals Limited (OTC Division)
Covagen
CorImmun GmbH
Aragon Pharmaceuticals, Inc.
Alios BioPharma, Inc.
Novira Therapeutics, Inc.
Actelion (Acq. 2017)
Momenta Pharmaceuticals (Acq. 2020)
Janssen R&D LLC
Janssen Healthcare Innovation
Janssen Biotech, Inc.
Ortho Biotech Inc.	
Ortho-Clinical Diagnostics, Inc.	
Johnson & Johnson Nordic AB	
Amic AB
Kite Merger Sub, Inc.	
Cougar Biotechnology, Inc.
RespiVert
BeneVir Biopharm, Inc.
Janssen Therapeutics
Janssen Diagnostics
Janssen Scientific Affairs
Crucell (Acq. 2010)
Ortho-McNeil-Janssen Pharmaceutical Services, Inc.
Janssen-Ortho
Ortho-McNeil
McNeil Consumer Healthcare (Acq. 1959)

Janssen COVID-19 vaccine 

In June 2020, Johnson & Johnson and the National Institute of Allergy and Infectious Diseases (NIAID) confirmed its intention to start a clinical trials of J&J's vaccine in September 2020, with the possibility of Phase 1/2a human clinical trials starting at an accelerated pace in the second half of July.

On 5 August 2020, the US government agreed to pay more than $1 billion to Johnson and Johnson (medical device company) for the production of 100 million doses of COVID-19 vaccine. As part of the agreed-upon deal, the U.S. can order up to 200 million additional doses of SARS-CoV-2 vaccine.

In September 2020, Johnson & Johnson started its 60,000-person phase 3 adenovirus-based vaccine trial. The trial was paused on October 12, 2020, because a volunteer became ill, but the company said it found no evidence that the vaccine had caused the illness and announced on October 23, 2020, that it would resume the trial.

In April 2021, the company reported that its Covid-19 vaccine achieved $100 million sales in the first quarter, accounting for less than 1% of its total revenue.

Business sectors 

The company's business is divided into three major business sectors: Pharmaceuticals, Medtech, and Consumer Health. In 2020, these segments contributed 55%, 28%, and 17%, respectively, of the company's total revenues.

Johnson & Johnson Innovation, LLC (JJI) is a subsidiary of Johnson & Johnson. JJI focuses on early-stage, life science, and technology innovations to advance the company’s research and development pipeline. JJI provides startups with sourcing, infrastructure, and capital equipment at JLABS, financing & venture capital at JJDC, Inc., and collaborations leading to the potential development of medical device technologies, pharmaceuticals, and therapeutics. There are 4 JJI Innovation Centers located in London, Shanghai, Boston (Cambridge), and the San Francisco Bay Area. There are 13 JLABS incubators located in the Bay Area (San Francisco and South San Francisco), Belgium (Beerse), Boston (Cambridge and Lowell), Houston (TMC), New York, Philadelphia, San Diego, Shanghai, Toronto, and Washington D.C.

Pharmaceuticals 
The Pharmaceutical segment is focused on six therapeutic areas: Immunology (rheumatoid arthritis, inflammatory bowel disease and psoriasis); Infectious Diseases (HIV/AIDS); Neuroscience (mood disorders, neurodegenerative disorders and schizophrenia); Oncology (prostate cancer and hematologic malignancies); Cardiovascular, Metabolism, & Retina (thrombosis and diabetes), and Pulmonary Hypertension (Pulmonary Arterial Hypertension).

Medtech 
The Cardiovascular & Specialty Solutions Group includes electrophysiology products that diagnose and treat cardiac arrhythmias; devices used in the endovascular treatment of hemorrhagic and ischemic stroke; solutions that focus on breast reconstruction and aesthetics, and ear, nose and throat procedures.

The orthopaedics portfolio is composed of specialties including joint reconstruction, trauma, extremities, craniomaxillofacial, spinal surgery and sports medicine, in addition to the VELY digital surgery portfolio.

The surgery portfolio includes advanced surgical innovations and solutions such as sutures, staplers, energy devices, and advanced hemostats along with interventional ablation, surgical robotics, and digital solutions.

The Johnson & Johnson Vision portfolio includes contact lens, intraocular lens, automated treatment for dry eye, and four brands of laser vision correction systems.

Consumer health 
The Consumer Health Business Sector includes a broad range of products focused on personal healthcare used in the skin health/beauty, over-the-counter medicines, baby care, oral care, women's health, and wound care markets. It comprises skin health/beauty, self-care, and essential health categories.

The skin health/beauty category includes personalized skin health assessments, treatments for acne, eczema and aging signs, and cleansers, moisturizers, and sunscreens.

The self-care category includes medicines for pain relief, smoking cessation, allergy, anti-diarrheal, antacids, nasal decongestants, and cough and colds.

The essential health category includes products for wound care, oral care, baby care and women's health.

In September 2022, Johnson & Johnson chose Kenvue as the new name for its Consumer Health business.

Finance 
For the fiscal year 2022, Johnson & Johnson reported earnings of $17.9 billion, with an annual revenue of $94.94 billion, an increase of 1.25% over the previous fiscal cycle. Johnson & Johnson's shares traded at over $175 per share, and its market capitalization was valued at over $439.8billion in September 2022.

Corporate governance 

The current members of the board of directors of Johnson & Johnson for 2023 are: Mary C. Beckerle; D Scott Davis; Ian E. L. Davis; Jennifer A Doudna; Alex Gorsky; Marillyn A. Hewson; Hubert Joly; Mark B. McClellan; Anne M. Mulcahy; A. Eugene Washington; Mark A. Weinberger; Nadja Y. West; and Darius Adamczyk.

The current members of the Executive Committee of Johnson & Johnson are: Joaquin Duato; Vanessa Broadhurst; Peter Fasolo; Liz Forminard; William N. Hait; Ashley McEvoy; Thibaut Mongon; James Swanson; Jennifer Taubert; Kathy Wengel; Joseph J. Wolk.

Joaquin Duato is Chairman and Chief Executive Officer.

Chairmen 

 Robert Wood Johnson I (1887–1910)
 James Wood Johnson (1910–1932)
 Robert Wood Johnson II (1932–1963)
 Philip B. Hofmann (1963–1973)
 Richard B. Sellars (1973–1976)
 James E. Burke (1976–1989)
 Ralph S. Larsen (1989–2002)
 William C. Weldon (2002–2012)
 Alex Gorsky (2012–2022)
 Joaquin Duato (2023-Present)

Headquarters and the New Brunswick gentrification 
The company has historically been located on the Delaware and Raritan Canal in New Brunswick. The company considered moving its headquarters out of New Brunswick in the 1960s but decided to stay in the town after city officials promised to revitalize downtown New Brunswick by demolishing old buildings and constructing new ones. While New Brunswick lost many historic structures, including the early home of Rutgers University, and most of its historic commercial waterfront to the redevelopment effort, the gentrification did attract people back to New Brunswick. Johnson & Johnson hired Henry N. Cobb from Pei Cobb Freed & Partners to design its new headquarters. Johnson and Johnson Plaza, in a park across the railroad tracks from the older portion of the headquarters, is one of tallest buildings in New Brunswick.

The stretch of Delaware and Raritan canal by the company's headquarters was replaced by a stretch of Route 18 in the late 1970s, after a lengthy dispute. In 2002, the company released its plan of setting up Asia-Pacific information technology headquarters in New South Wales within five years.

Environmental record 
Johnson & Johnson has set several positive goals to keep the company environmentally friendly and was ranked third among the United States's largest companies in Newsweeks "Green Rankings". Some examples are the reduction in water use, waste, and energy use and an increased level of transparency. Johnson & Johnson agreed to change its packaging of plastic bottles used in the manufacturing process, switching their packaging of liquids to non-polyvinyl chloride containers. The corporation is working with the Climate Northwest Initiative and the EPA National Environmental Performance Track program. As a member of the national Green Power Partnership, Johnson & Johnson operates the largest solar power generator in Pennsylvania at its site in Fort Washington, Pennsylvania.

Recalls and litigation

1982 Chicago Tylenol murders 

On September 29, 1982, a "Tylenol scare" began when the first of seven individuals died in Chicago metropolitan area, after ingesting Extra Strength Tylenol that had been deliberately laced with cyanide. Within a week, the company pulled 31 million bottles of capsules back from retailers, making it one of the first major recalls in American history. The incident led to reforms in the packaging of over-the-counter substances and to federal anti-tampering laws. The case remains unsolved and no suspects have been charged. Johnson & Johnson's quick response, including a nationwide recall, was widely praised by public relations experts and the media and was the gold standard for corporate crisis management.

2010 children's product recall 

On April 30, 2010, McNeil Consumer Healthcare, a subsidiary of Johnson and Johnson, voluntarily recalled 43 over-the-counter children's medicines, including Tylenol, Tylenol Plus, Motrin, Zyrtec and Benadryl. The recall was conducted after a routine inspection at a manufacturing facility in Fort Washington, Pennsylvania, United States, revealed that some "products may not fully meet the required manufacturing specifications". Affected products may contain a "higher concentration of active ingredients" or exhibit other manufacturing defects. Products shipped to Canada, Dominican Republic, Mexico, Guam, Guatemala, Jamaica, Puerto Rico, Panama, Trinidad and Tobago, the United Arab Emirates, Kuwait and Fiji were included in the recall. In a statement, Johnson & Johnson said "a comprehensive quality assessment across its manufacturing operations" was underway. A dedicated website was established by the company listing affected products and other consumer information.

2010 hip-replacement recall 

On August 24, 2010, DePuy, a subsidiary of American giant Johnson & Johnson, recalled its ASR (articular surface replacement) hip prostheses from the market. DePuy said the recall was due to unpublished National Joint Registry data showing a 12% revision rate for resurfacing at five years and an ASR XL revision rate of 13%. All hip prostheses fail in some patients, but it is expected that the rate will be about 1% a year.
Pathologically, the failing prosthesis had several effects. Metal debris from wear of the implant led to a reaction that destroyed the soft tissues surrounding the joint, leaving some patients with long term disability. Ions of cobalt and chromiumthe metals from which the implant was madewere also released into the blood and cerebral spinal fluid in some patients.

In March 2013, a jury in Los Angeles ordered Johnson & Johnson to pay more than $8.3million in damages to a Montana man in the first of more than 10,000 lawsuits pending against the company in connection with the now-recalled DePuy hip.

Some lawyers and industry analysts have estimated that the suits ultimately will cost Johnson & Johnson billions of dollars to resolve.

2010 Tylenol recall 
In 2010 and 2011, Johnson & Johnson voluntarily recalled some over-the-counter products, including Tylenol, due to an odor caused by tribromoanisole. In this case, 2,4,6-tribromophenol was used to treat wooden pallets on which product packaging materials were transported and stored.

Shareholders lawsuit 
In 2010 a group of shareholders sued the board for allegedly failing to take action to prevent serious failings and illegalities since the 1990s, including manufacturing problems, bribing officials, covering up adverse effects and misleading marketing for unapproved uses. The judge initially dismissed the case in September 2011, but allowed the plaintiffs opportunity to refile at a later time. In 2012 Johnson and Johnson proposed a settlement with the shareholders, whereby the company would institute new oversight, quality and compliance procedures binding for five years.

Illegal marketing of Risperdal 
Juries in several US states have found J&J guilty of concealing the adverse effects of Janssen Pharmaceuticals' antipsychotic medication Risperdal, produced by its unit, in order to promote it to doctors and patients as better than cheaper generics, and of falsely marketing it for treating patients with dementia. States that have awarded damages include Texas ($158million), South Carolina ($327million), Louisiana ($258million), and most notably Arkansas ($1.2billion).

In 2010, the United States Department of Justice joined a whistleblowers suit accusing the company of illegally marketing Risperdal through Omnicare, the largest company supplying pharmaceuticals to nursing homes. The allegations include that J&J were warned by the FDA to not promote Risperdal as effective and safe for elderly patients, but they did so, and that they paid Omnicare to promote the drug to care home physicians. The settlement was finalized on November 4, 2013, with J&J agreeing to pay a penalty of around $2.2billion, "including criminal fines and forfeiture totaling $485million and civil settlements with the federal government and states totaling $1.72billion".

Johnson & Johnson has also been subject to congressional investigations related to payments given to psychiatrists to promote its products and ghost write articles, notably Joseph Biederman and his pediatric bipolar disorder research unit.

Foreign bribery 
In 2011, J&J settled litigation brought by the US Securities and Exchange Commission under the Foreign Corrupt Practices Act and paid around $70M in disgorgement and fines. J&J's employees had given kickbacks and bribes to doctors in Greece, Poland, and Romania to obtain business selling drugs and medical devices and had bribed officials in Iraq to win contracts under the Oil for Food program. J&J fully cooperated with the investigation once the problems came to light.

Consumer fraud settlements 
In May 2017, J&J reached an agreement to pay $33million to several states to settle consumer fraud allegations in some of the company's over-the-counter drugs.

Use of the Red Cross symbol 

Johnson & Johnson registered the Red Cross as a U.S. trademark for "medicinal and surgical plasters" in 1905 and has used the design since 1887. The Geneva Conventions, which reserved the Red Cross emblem for specific uses, were first approved in 1864 and ratified by the United States in 1882. However, the emblem was not protected by U.S. law for the use of the American Red Cross (ARC) and the U.S. military until after Johnson & Johnson had obtained its trademark. A clause in this law (now 18 U.S.C. 706) permits this pre-existing use of the Red Cross to continue.

A declaration made by the U.S. upon its ratification of the 1949 Geneva Conventions includes a reservation that pre-1905 U.S. domestic uses of the Red Cross, such as Johnson & Johnson's, would remain lawful as long as the cross is not used on "aircraft, vessels, vehicles, buildings or other structures, or upon the ground," i.e., uses which could be confused with its military uses. This means that the U.S. did not agree to any interpretation of the 1949 Geneva Conventions that would overrule Johnson & Johnson's trademark. The American Red Cross continues to recognize the validity of Johnson & Johnson's trademark.

In August 2007, Johnson & Johnson filed a lawsuit against the ARC, demanding that the charity halt the use of the red cross symbol on products it sells to the public, though the company takes no issue with the charity's use of the mark for non-profit purposes. In May 2008, the judge in the case dismissed most of Johnson & Johnson's claims, and a month later the two organizations announced a settlement had been reached in which both parties would continue to use the symbol.

Boston Scientific lawsuits 
Since 2003, Johnson & Johnson and Boston Scientific have both claimed that the other had infringed on their patents covering heart stent medical devices. The litigation was settled when Boston Scientific agreed to pay $716million to Johnson & Johnson in September 2009 and an additional $1.73billion in February 2010. Their dispute was renewed in 2014, now on the grounds of a contract dispute.

Patent-infringement case against Abbott 
In 2007, Johnson & Johnson sued Abbott Laboratories over the development and sale of the arthritis drug Humira, claiming Abbott used technology licensed exclusively to Johnson & Johnson's Centocor division. Johnson & Johnson won the court case, and in 2009 Abbott was ordered to pay Johnson & Johnson $1.17billion in lost revenues and $504million in royalties. The judge also added $175.6million in interest to bring the total to $1.84billion. This was the largest patent-infringement award in U.S. history until the 2013 decision against Teva in favor of Takeda and Pfizer for over $2.1billion. In 2010 Abbott appealed the verdict and in 2011 won the appeal.

Vaginal mesh implants 
Tens of thousands of women worldwide have taken legal action against Johnson & Johnson after suffering serious complications following a vaginal mesh implant procedure. In Australia, more than 700 women began a class action against the company in the Federal Court of Australia in 2017, telling the court they "suffered irreparable, debilitating pain after the devices began to erode into surrounding tissue and organs, causing infections and complications". The class action alleged that Johnson & Johnson, which "aggressively marketed" the implants "failed to properly warn patients and surgeons of the risk, or test the devices adequately". Emails between executives show the company was aware of the risks in 2005 but still went ahead and made the product available. In November 2019 the Federal Court of Australia found Johnson & Johnson negligent. The judgment was appealed, with the appeals court upholding all findings of Justice Anna Katzman. Ethicon then sought a High Court decision but this was not permitted by the High Court of Australia. Subsequently (September 2022) a $AU 300, 000, 000 compensation agreement was reached between Shine Lawyers and J&J but this agreement remains subject to approval by the Federal Court of Australia.

In the US in 2016 the U.S. states of California and Washington filed a lawsuit against the company, accusing it of deception. In October 2019, the company and its subsidiary, Ethicon, Inc. reached a settlement with 41 states and the District of Columbia, with no admission of liability, in a suit alleging deceptive marketing of transvaginal surgical-mesh devices. The suit also alleges that the company failed to disclose risks associated with the product, which J&J pulled from the US market in 2012. The amount settled in the suit was about $117million.

Baby powder 
J&J has been the subject of over 26,000 lawsuits claiming that its baby powder causes ovarian cancer. The lawsuits focus on claims that the talc-based powder is contaminated with asbestos, a known carcinogen commonly found in places where talc is mined.

In 2016, J&J was ordered to pay $72million in damages to the family of Jacqueline Fox, a 62-year-old woman who died of ovarian cancer in 2015. The company said it would appeal. A year later, over 1,000 U.S. women had sued J&J for covering up the possible cancer risk from its Baby Powder product. The company says that 70% of its Baby Powder is used by adults. Later that year, a California jury ordered Johnson & Johnson to pay $417million to a woman who claimed she developed ovarian cancer after using the company's talc-based products like Johnson's Baby Powder for feminine hygiene. The verdict included $70million in compensatory damages and $347million in punitive damages. J&J said they would appeal the verdict. The Missouri Eastern District appeals court later negated a $72million jury verdict in the Jacqueline Fox lawsuit, ruling it lacked jurisdiction in Missouri because of a U.S. Supreme Court decision that imposed limits on where injury lawsuit can be filed. Subsequently, this ruling killed three other recent St. Louis jury verdicts of more than $200million combined. Fox, 62, of Birmingham, Alabama, died in 2015, about four months before her trial was held in St. Louis Circuit Court. She was among 65 plaintiffs, of whom only two were from Missouri.

A St. Louis jury awarded nearly $4.7billion in damages to 22 women and their families in 2018 after they claimed that asbestos in Johnson & Johnson talcum powder caused their ovarian cancer. In August, J&J said that it removed several chemicals from baby powder products and re-engineered them to make consumers more confident that products were safer for children. The company was forced to release internal documents with 11,700 people suing J&J over cancers allegedly caused by baby powder. The documents showed that the company had known about asbestos contamination since at least as early as 1971 and had spent decades finding ways to conceal the evidence from the public.

The company lost its request to reverse a jury verdict that ruled in favor of the accusers, which required the company to pay $4.14billion in punitive damages and $550million in compensatory damages. A large study performed in 2003 found that ovarian cancer risk increased from a baseline of 0.0121% to 0.0161% in people who reported regularly using talc in the genital area. Two more studies over the next twelve years, which also relied on self-reporting, had similar results; however, none of the three studies showed a relationship between how long someone used talc and how much their cancer risk increased, which is expected in experiments with carcinogens and other toxic substances (see dose-response relationship).

Conversely, a St. Louis jury ruled in favor of Johnson & Johnson in the case of a single plaintiff who had used the company's talc-containing baby powder for thirty years with a similar claim. The company's CEO, Alex Gorsky, declined to appear at a United States congressional hearing on the safety of J&J's Baby Powder and other talc-based cosmetics. J&J spokesman Ernie Knewitz said that the subcommittee had rejected the company's offers to send a talc testing expert or a J&J executive in charge of consumer products. In response to declining demand, J&J announced it would discontinue the sale of talc-based baby powder in the United States and Canada in 2020, but would continue to sell it in other markets. In a statement, the company said that the existing retail inventory of the talc-based powder will sell until it runs out, while the company's cornstarch-based baby powder will continue to sell in the United States and Canada.

The Supreme Court of Missouri refused to consider J&J's appeal of a $2.12 billion damages award to women who blamed their ovarian cancer on its talc-based products.

The Supreme Court of the United States also refused to consider an appeal from J&J, leaving in place a judgment from a state appeal court that had cut the original award to $2.1 billion. Two of the justices had to recuse: Samuel Alito because either he and/or his wife owning or recently owning stock in J&J, and Brett Kavanaugh, whose father led an industry group lobbying against safety warnings on talc products. Representing the affected women during the trial, Mark Lanier remarked that the Supreme Court's decision sent "a clear message to the rich and powerful: You will be held to account when you cause grievous harm under our system of equal justice under law." J&J had argued that the combined claims in the St. Louis trial were too different, yet the short jury deliberation and identical payouts were, therefore, a violation of the company's due process and also that the high punitive award was unconstitutional.

In 2021, Johnson & Johnson subsidiary LTL Management LLC, using a process called a Texas divisional merger, filed for Chapter 11 bankruptcy in North Carolina. The process allowed by Texas law lets a company create a separate subsidiary to take over liabilities, with the existing company operating normally. The new company, with a different name, can locate in a state such as North Carolina where bankruptcy laws are different, and then declare bankruptcy, paying less than the original company would have. In the case of LTL, a $2 billion trust will be created, compared to $25 billion if Johnson & Johnson had declared bankruptcy. According to the filing, a company known as Old JJCI took on the baby powder related liabilities in 1979, while Johnson & Johnson remained a defendant. LTL and New JJCI were created with LTL taking the baby powder related liabilities and some assets, and New JJCI taking the remaining assets. Johnson & Johnson says LTL is now based in New Jersey.

The company announced that it would stop making talc-based powder by 2023 and replace it with cornstarch-based powders. The company says the talc-based powder is safe to use and does not contain asbestos.

Opioid epidemic 

By 2018, the company had become embroiled in the opioid epidemic in the United States and had become a target of lawsuits. Over 500 opioid-related cases have been filed as of May 2018 against J&J and its competitors. In Idaho, J&J is part of a lawsuit accusing the company for being partially to blame for opioid-related overdose deaths. The first major trial began in Oklahoma in May 2019. On August 26, 2019, the Oklahoma judge ordered J&J to pay $572million for their part in the opioid crisis, and in October J&J paid $20.4million to two Ohio counties fighting the opioid epidemic. In January 2022, Johnson & Johnson agreed to pay up to $5 billion as part of a $26 billion settlement which included McKesson, AmerisourceBergen, and Cardinal Health. Had the states gone to court, the companies could have faced up to $95 billion in penalties.

Northeastern Ohio Settlement 
In October 2019, the company agreed to a settlement of $20.4million with two Ohio countiesCuyahoga (Cleveland) and Summit (Akron). The settlement allows the company avoidance of a trial accusing J&J and many other pharmaceutical manufacturers of helping to spark the US opioid epidemic. The trial was thought to be an indicator for thousands of opioid-related lawsuits against many drug manufacturers. The arrangement, which contains no admission of liability by the company, provides the counties $10million in cash, $5million for legal expenses and $5.4million in contributions to opioid-related non-profit organizations in the counties.

Public-private engagement 
Johnson & Johnson and its subsidiaries engage with the public and private sectors in a variety of settings including to promote research and development, academic funding, event sponsorship, philanthropy, and political lobbying.

Academia 
 J&J is a matching gift donor to the Institute for Advanced Study.

Activism 
 J&J is a corporate partner of Human Rights Campaign, a large LGBT advocacy group.
 J&J is a financial supporter of Women Deliver.

Political lobbying 
Johnson & Johnson is engaged in various forms of lobbying in the United States, Canada and internationally, including through corporate philanthropy and membership in lobbying organizations.
 J&J is one of the largest donors to the Foundation for the National Institutes of Health (FNIH), having donated between $5–10 million from 2000 to 2020.
 J&J is a partner of the Pandemic Action Network.
 J&J is a member company of Pharmaceutical Research and Manufacturers of America (PhRMA), a trade association that lobbies the U.S. Government on behalf of the pharmaceutical industry. PhRMA has offices in Washington, D.C., Japan and the United Arab Emirates.
 J&J is a member of the Personalized Medicine Coalition, a medical research advocacy group that lobbies on behalf of the pharmaceutical industry to increase funding for personalized medicine research and development.
 J&J is a member company of the National Pharmaceutical Council (NPC), a non-profit that advocates for expanded research funding and innovation.

Research and development 
J&J has provided research grants and major funding to the C. D. Howe Institute.

See also 

 Zodiac (schooner)

References

External links 

 

 
Companies listed on the New York Stock Exchange
1886 establishments in New Jersey
Companies based in New Brunswick, New Jersey
American companies established in 1886
Dental companies of the United States
Companies in the Dow Jones Industrial Average
Multinational companies headquartered in the United States
Health care companies based in New Jersey
Personal care companies
Pharmaceutical companies based in New Jersey
Pharmaceutical companies of the United States
Orphan drug companies
Life sciences industry
Conglomerate companies of the United States
Medical technology companies of the United States
Pharmaceutical companies established in 1886
1940s initial public offerings
COVID-19 vaccine producers